Captain Jeremiah Zachariah Brown (November 7, 1839 – February 19, 1916) was a Union soldier who fought in the American Civil War with the 148th Pennsylvania Infantry. He was one of four members of the regiment to receive the Medal of Honor: the United States' highest award for bravery during combat.

Brown joined the army from Rimersburg, Pennsylvania in September 1862, and was commissioned as an officer the next year. He was mustered out in June 1865.

References

1839 births
1916 deaths
People from Armstrong County, Pennsylvania
Union Army soldiers
United States Army Medal of Honor recipients
American Civil War recipients of the Medal of Honor